Lauren Phillips (born 1981) is a Welsh television actress from Bridgend, Wales. 

She is best known for playing the no-nonsense character, Kelly Evans, in the Welsh TV soap Pobol y Cwm. She originally played the character between 2003 and 2007, reprising the role in 2015, covering social issues such as bulimia in the early years. She has also played the role of art teacher Sara Harries in the S4C dramas Caerdydd and Gwaith/Cartref.

References

External links

1981 births
Living people
Welsh soap opera actresses
Welsh television actresses
People from Bridgend
Welsh-speaking actors